Camiguin is an island province in Mindanao, Philippines.

Camiguin may also refer to:
 Camiguin de Babuyanes in the Babuyan Islands, Luzon
 Camiguin Airport, Mindanao